Heavy Clan is a musical group that are the best known representatives of Salvadoran reggaeton (not hip hop). They are famous for feuding with legendary Salvadoran rap group Pescozada. They have, however, performed in concerts with DJ Pollo and Wisin & Yandel, and their most famous song is Cuerpo a Cuerpo. Their members are Eric Roberto Zaragoza, Manuel Lopez, Jose Gonzalez and William Hernandez.

Discography	
Factoria del Bellacos 
Cuerpo a Cuerpo

Salvadoran musical groups
Salvadoran rappers
Reggaeton groups